Vrčice (in older sources also Brčice,  or Wertschitsch) is a small settlement in the Municipality of Semič in Slovenia. The area is part of the historical region of Lower Carniola. The municipality is now included in the Southeast Slovenia Statistical Region.

Name
The Slovene name Vrčice is believed to be derived from the German name Wertschitz and that, in turn, from the Slavic prepositional phrase *vъ rěčicě 'in/at the creek'. Vrčica Creek flows through the village.

Church

The local church is dedicated to the Assumption of Mary and belongs to the Parish of Semič. It dates to the mid-18th century.

References

External links

Vrčice at Geopedia

Populated places in the Municipality of Semič